{{Album ratings
| rev1 = Allmusic
| rev1Score = <ref name="allmusic">{{cite web|last1=Kurutz|first1=Steve|url=https://www.allmusic.com/album/jermaine-mw0000454373|title=Jermaine|work=Allmusic|accessdate=October 28, 2017}}</ref>}}Jermaine is the debut solo album from American singer Jermaine Jackson, released in 1972, two months after the release of Lookin' Through the Windows''. It reached number 27 on the Billboard pop albums chart.  The singles, "That's How Love Goes" and "Daddy's Home", peaked at No. 46 and No. 9 on the Billboard Hot 100 singles chart, respectively.

The album was arranged by David Van DePitte, James Anthony Carmichael, David Blumberg, The Corporation, H.B. Barnum and Gene Page. Berry Gordy was the executive producer and Jim Britt responsible for the cover photography.

Track listing
Side A
 "That's How Love Goes" (Johnny Bristol, David H. Jones, Jr., Wade Brown, Jr.) - 3:27
 "I'm in a Different World" (Eddie Holland, Jr., Lamont Dozier, Brian Holland) - 3:06
 "Homeward Bound" (Paul Simon) - 3:00
 "Take Me in Your Arms (Rock Me a Little While)" (Holland Jr., Dozier, Holland) - 3:10
 "I Only Have Eyes For You" (Al Dubin, Harry Warren) - 2:41

Side B
 "I Let Love Pass Me By" (Bristol, Jones, Jr., Brown, Jr.) - 3:08
 "Live It Up" (The Corporation) - 3:01
 "If You Were My Woman" (Leon Ware, Pamela Sawyer, Clay McMurray) - 3:40
 "Ain't That Peculiar" (William "Smokey" Robinson, Warren "Pete" Moore, Marvin Tarplin, Robert Rogers) - 3:12
 "Daddy's Home" (James Sheppard, William H. Miller) - 3:04

References

1972 debut albums
Albums arranged by Gene Page
Albums arranged by H. B. Barnum
Albums produced by Johnny Bristol
Albums produced by Hal Davis
Albums produced by the Corporation (record production team)
Jermaine Jackson albums
Motown albums